This is a list of Arkansas State Red Wolves football players in the NFL Draft.

Key

Selections

References

Arkansas State

Arkansas State Red Wolves NFL draft